Padam Onnu: Oru Vilapam is a 2003 Indian Malayalam film, written and directed by T. V. Chandran. The film stars Meera Jasmine in lead role as Shahina, who won the prestigious National Film Award for Best Actress and Kerala State Film Award for Best Actress in 2003 for her performance in this movie.

Plot
Razia, holding a baby, is sent back home by her husband because her parents have failed to give the promised dowry. Razia's friend, Shahina, visited her. She tries to cheer her up by talking about the baby and their days at school.

Hassan Moyeen is a busy matchmaker. Economically backward families typically opt for a Mysore marriage – where they give their daughters in marriage to unknown men from the neighbouring province of Mysore. Razia's was one such marriage brokered by Hassan Moyeen. Her husband arrives seeking the remaining dowry amount, and seeks Hassan's intervention.

Shahina's mother, Saphia, makes a living by making rice dumplings and selling them at a nearby teashop.

Rasaq, an already married man with a child, is trying to leave for the Middle East in search of a job. He decides to get married again so that he can use the dowry to fund his trip. Hassan was hired to find a match for him. He impresses upon Saphia and her brother Abdu that it is time for Shahina to be married off.

Shahina reacts violently to the proposal because she wants to continue her studies. In spite of her mother's sympathy, the elders, especially the men, try to dissuade her from her studies. For them her defiance amounts to deviant behavior. Finally, Shahina is forced to give in.

Rasaq meets with repeated failure in his attempts to consummate his marriage with Shahina, because sex is something the girl cannot make sense of. His very sight provokes revulsion in her. Rasaq's first wife, Wahida, feels sorry for Shahina. On her part, Shahina takes a liking to Rasaq's daughter, Mumtaz, and the two become inseparable.

Meanwhile, Rasaq forces Wahida to administer sedatives to Shahina. While she sleeps, Rasaq fulfills his sexual desire over Shahina. When she wakes up, a shocked Shahina turns hysterical in anger. Rasaq uses her behavior as a pretext to divorce her. He takes her back home where Shahina resumes her studies. On the first day of exams, she slumps on her desk. A medical examination reveals that she is pregnant. A dejected Saphia dies. Shahina is accused of adultery and ostracised.

Cast
 Meera Jasmine as Shahina
 Irshad as Rasaq, Shahina and Wahida's husband
 Keerthana Anil as Mumtaz, Rasaq's daughter 
 Mamukkoya as Hassan Moythu, a marriage broker
 Suja Karthika as Janakikutty
 Anu Joseph as Wahida, Rasaq's first wife
 M. R. Gopakumar as Abdu, Shahina's brother
 Santha Devi as Saphia, Shahina's mother
 Anamika Sivaraj as Razia, Shahina's friend
 Roslin as Rasaq's mother
 Manikandan as School Teacher
 P. Sreekumar as Hajyaru
 Salu Kuttanadu as Thangal

Awards
National Film Award
 Best Film on Family Welfare :Aryadan Shoukath
 Best Actress : Meera Jasmine
Kerala State Film Awards
Kerala State Film Award for Second Best Film :Aryadan Shoukath
Kerala State Film Award for Best Actress : Meera Jasmine
Kerala State Film Award for Second Best Actress: Rosalin
Kerala State Film Award for Best Story: Aryadan Shoukat 
Kerala State Film Award for Special Jury Award: P. Sreekumar 
Asianet Film Awards
Best Actress: Meera Jasmine
Kerala film critics award
Best Film : Aryadan Shoukath
Best Director: T. V. Chandran
Best Actress: Meera Jasmine
V Shantaram Award
 Best Actress: Meera Jasmine
Mathrubhumi Film Awards
 Mathrubhumi - Medimix Award for Best Actress: Meera Jasmine
National Film Academy Award
 Best Actress: Meera Jasmine
Kerala Film Audience Council Award
 Best Actress: Meera Jasmine

References

External links
 

2003 films
Films featuring a Best Actress National Award-winning performance
2000s Malayalam-language films
Films scored by Johnson
Films directed by T. V. Chandran
Best Film on Family Welfare National Film Award winners
Films shot in Mysore
Teenage pregnancy in film